All Power to the People: The Black Panther Party and Beyond is a 1996 documentary directed by Lee Lew-Lee. The film chronicles the history of the Black Panther Party, leadership, and members.  The film also briefly chronicles the history of the American Indian Movement and Black Liberation Army. The film covers assassinations and methods used to divide, destroy, and imprison key figures within the party.  It is composed primarily of archival footage and interviews of former organization members and government agents. The documentary was broadcast in 24 countries on 12 networks in the United States, Canada, Europe, Asia and Australia between 1997 and 2000.

Interviewees

Members of Black Power organizations

 Mumia Abu-Jamal - member of the Black Panther Party, 1969–1971
 Dhoruba al-Mujahid bin Wahad - member of the Black Panther Party, 1968–1971
 Sofiya Alston Bukhari - member of the Black Panther Party, 1969–1971 and Black Liberation Army, 1972–1974
 Kathleen Cleaver - central committee member of the Black Panther Party, 1967–1971
 Emory Douglas - central committee member of the Black Panther Party, 1967–1972
 George Edwards - member of the Black Panther Party, 1969–1974
 Herman Ferguson - member of Republic of New Afrika
 Ronald Freeman - member of the Black Panther Party, 1968–1971
 Ali Bey Hassan - member of the Black Panther Party, 1968–1971 and Black Liberation Army, 1971–1973
 Kim Holder - member of the Black Panther Party, 1969–1971
 Mark Holder - member of the Black Panther Party, 1969–1971 and Black Liberation Army, 1971–1972
 Michael McCarty - member of the Black Panther Party, 1968–1971 and acupuncture doctor
 Thomas McCreary - member of the Black Panther Party, 1968–1971
 Somaya Moore - member of the Black Panther Party, 1969–1971
 Bobby Seale - co-founder and chairman of the Black Panther Party, 1966–1974
 Mutulu Shakur -  member of the Black Liberation Army and acupuncture doctor 
 Ron Wilkins - vice chairman of the Student Nonviolent Coordinating Committee, 1968–1969

Government agents
 Philip Agee - Central Intelligence Agency officer, 1958–1969
 Ramsey Clark - US Attorney General, 1965–1968
 M. Wesley Swearingen - special agent of the Federal Bureau of Investigation, 1950–1977
 William Turner - special agent of the Federal Bureau of Investigation, 1950–1961

Others

 Ward Churchill - member of the American Indian Movement
 Alex Constantine - private researcher
 Donald Freed - private researcher
 John Judge - private investigator of assassinations
 Yuri Kochiyama - Asian-American activist, friend of Malcolm X
 Sarah McClendon - member of the White House press corps, 1931–1996
 Jim McCluskey - founder of Centurion Ministries
 Charles Mingus III - artist
 Nobuko Miyamoto - Japanese-American activist
 Gordon Parks - photo journalist of Life magazine, 1949–1971
 Leonard Peltier - member of the American Indian Movement
 Jim Vander Wal - private researcher

Awards
 Best Historical Documentary, National Black Programming Consortium (ITVS/PBS) 1998
 Black Filmworks Award, Black Filmmakers Hall of Fame 1998
 Best Director, Finalist, Gordon Parks Award (MTV/ IFP) 1998
 Critic's Award,  Southern Film Festival Memphis Black Writer's Conference 1999
 Paul Robeson Award for Excellence in Independent Filmmaking, The Newark Film Festival (Mobil Oil / Newark Museum) 1997
 Robert Townsend Tenacity Award, Roy W. Dean Awards, 1997
 Paul Robeson Grant Award, Paul Robeson Fund for Independent Media, 1997
 The Windy City International Documentary Festival (Columbia College, Chicago), 1997
 The Grand Prize, Roy W. Dean Awards, 1995

See also
 COINTELPRO

References

Further reading

External links

 

1996 documentary films
1996 films
American documentary films
Documentary films about the Black Panther Party
Black Power
Documentary films about African Americans
1990s English-language films
1990s American films